Jaguar warriors or jaguar knights, ocēlōtl  (singular) or ocēlōmeh  (plural) were members of the Aztec military elite. They were a type of Aztec warrior called a cuāuhocēlōtl . The word cuāuhocēlōtl derives from the eagle warrior cuāuhtli  and the Jaguar Warrior ocēlōtl. They were an elite military unit similar to the eagle warriors.

The jaguar motif was used due to the belief the jaguar represented Tezcatlipoca. Aztecs also wore this dress at war because they believed the animal's strengths would be given to them during battles. Jaguar warriors were used at the battlefront in military campaigns. They were also used to capture prisoners for sacrifice to the Aztec gods. Many statues and images (in pre-Columbian and post-Columbian codices) of these warriors have survived. They fought with a wooden club  studded with obsidian volcanic glass blades, called a macuahuitl. They also used spears and atlatls.

To become a jaguar warrior, a member of the Aztec army had to capture a total of four enemies from battles. This was said to honor their gods in a way far greater than killing enemy soldiers in the battlefield. For a warrior to kill an enemy was considered clumsy.

Education 

The formal education of the Aztecs was to train and teach young boys how to function in their society as warriors. The Aztecs had no standing army, so every boy not of noble birth was trained to become a warrior.  All boys who were between the ages of ten and twenty years old would attend one of the two schools. These two schools were the Telpochcalli (the neighborhood school for commoners) and the Calmecac, the exclusive school for nobles. At the Telpochcalli students would learn the art of warfare, and would become warriors. At the Calmecac students would be trained to become military leaders, priests, government officials, etc.

At the age of 15, sons of commoners would be sent to a Telpochcalli within their neighborhood.  Here, boys would be trained in the art of warfare and accustomed to military life. The instructors at these schools were veteran warriors who had experience in warfare and leadership. The schools focused on bravery and included a great deal of physical effort and intense pain to increase the strength and stamina of the students. Manual labor included transporting goods such as branches for firewood. The longer the student had attended the school, the more branches he would be expected to carry. This test of carrying firewood would be used to determine if the boy would do well in warfare.

Other manual labor tasks carried out from the Telpochcalli would be community projects. These projects would mainly consist of cleaning areas, building walls, digging canals, and farming. From these projects, students would work hard to complete tasks, and gain the physical experience needed to engage in warfare. The students of this school would also be used to transport shields, food, military supplies, weapons, armor, and wood to warriors on the battlefield. The reason for forcing the students to be near the battlefield was to make them fearless of warfare. Students were under heavy surveillance at all times. If a student was caught leaving training his punishment would be severe. Often, he would be beaten and his hair removed. Removing a student's hair would remove any sign of that boy's being a warrior. Drinking pulque was prohibited; if caught, the student could be beaten to death. Relationships outside of the school were also prohibited; if a student was caught sleeping with a woman, he would be beaten to death, or severely punished.

Life as a jaguar warrior 

Following the warrior's path was one of the few ways to change one's social status in Aztec culture.  Eagle and Jaguar warriors were full-time warriors who worked for the city-state to protect merchants and the city itself.  They were expected to be leaders and commanders both on and off the battlefield and acted as sort of a police force for the city. Men who reached this rank were considered as nobles and elites of society and were granted many of the same privileges as a noble.  They were allowed to drink pulque, have concubines, and dine at the royal palace.  Jaguar warriors also participated in gladiatorial sacrifices.

See also 
 Aztec warfare
Eagle warrior
 Jaguars in Mesoamerican culture

References 

 Carrasco, David. Daily Life of The Aztecs: People of the Sun and Earth. Connecticut: Greenwood Press, 1998.
 Carrasco, D. 1998, 200.
 Sahagun, Bernardino de. Florentine Codex: General History of the Things of New Spain. Translated and edited by Arthur J. O. Anderson and Charles E. Dibble. 13 vols. Santa Fe: School of American Research, and University of Utah, 1950-1982.
 Sahagun, Florentine Codex, VIII: 52.
 Smith, Michael E. The Aztecs. 3rd Ed. West Sussex: Blackwell Publishing, 2012.
 Smith, M. 2012, 130.
 Smith, M. 2012, 162.
 Smith, M. 2012, 173-174.

Soldiers
Aztec warfare
Combat occupations
Military units and formations of the Middle Ages
Warriors